TJ Sokol Ovčáry is a football club located in the village of Ovčáry (Mělník District), Czech Republic. The club played in the Bohemian Football League in the 2011–2012 season.

Despite finishing 10th of 18 teams in the 2011–12 Bohemian Football League, due to financial reasons Ovčáry left the league at the end of the season and took their place two divisions lower, in the Středočeský krajský přebor, the following season.

References

External links
  

Football clubs in the Czech Republic
Sokol